"Morning Glory" is a song by the English rock band Oasis, written by Noel Gallagher and released on the band's second album (What's the Story) Morning Glory? in September 1995. It was given a commercial single release only in Australia, New Zealand, and Japan, and it was also a radio single in the United States and Canada. In North America, it was the first song of the album to receive significant airplay, although primarily at alternative rock radio stations, as "Some Might Say" and "Roll with It" had not achieved as such.

Content

Lyrics and themes
"Morning Glory" contains lyrical references to the drug cocaine and to the Beatles, and references the title of its parent album in the chorus.

Musical style
Kenneth Partridge proclaimed the riff that opens "Morning Glory" to be "strikingly similar" to that of "The One I Love" by American rock band R.E.M.

Music video
The song's accompanying video is directed by Jake Scott. The band is performing in an industrial apartment, suggested by the opening shots of the video to be the Balfron Tower (not to be mistaken with Trellick Tower), as the building's tenants (including a man with a baby, a young boy, an old man and a female cyclist, an elderly woman with a hair dryer, a middle-aged woman in a house coat, a mafia boss and two bodyguards, an Indian couple, a drug addict, another elderly woman, and young woman and her mother) take offence to the loud noise of the band's playing and come up to knock on the door and look in the mail slot. The video concludes with all the tenants gathering around the door, beating on it and yelling, just as the band finishes playing and packs up their instruments.

Other releases
 In October 2005, a remix of the song was released on the soundtrack to the movie Goal!.  It was done by Don't Believe the Truth producer Dave Sardy.
 The song is included on Oasis' compilation album Stop the Clocks. On the original album, the song segues into the 40-second untitled track, which in turn segues into "Champagne Supernova". This is the same thing that happens on Stop the Clocks, except the untitled track is not included, leaving the water sounds from "Morning Glory" to directly segue straight into "Champagne Supernova".

Track listings
Australian CD and cassette single; Japanese CD single 
 "Morning Glory"
 "It's Better People"
 "Rockin' Chair"
 "Live Forever" (live at Glastonbury '95, 23 June 1995)

Personnel
 Liam Gallagher – vocals, tambourine
 Noel Gallagher – lead guitars, backing vocals
 Paul "Bonehead" Arthurs – rhythm guitar
 Paul "Guigsy" McGuigan – bass
 Alan White – drums, percussion
 Brian Cannon – keyboard
 Owen Morris – sound effects

Charts

Weekly charts

Year-end charts

Certifications

Release history

References

External links
 Lyrics

1995 songs
1995 singles
Oasis (band) songs
Creation Records singles
Epic Records singles
Music videos directed by Jake Scott (director)
Song recordings produced by Noel Gallagher
Songs written by Noel Gallagher